The Ibanda-Kyerwa National Park, previously Ibanda Game Reserve, is a national park in Tanzania. Originally established in 1974, it was designated a national park in 2019. The park is rich in wildlife attractions and sunrise and sunset are easily seen. Animals found in this national park include hippos, antelopes, Thomson gazelles, impalas, elands, and baboons. The park can be reached by flight from Dar es Salaam Airport to Bukoba Airport and then by road from Bukoba town to the park.

The rainy season is between January to April.

Kagera River is the main source of water for this park and nourishes its rich resources. 

Hunting safaris are the most common activities in this area.

References

Protected areas of Tanzania
Protected areas established in 1974
1974 establishments in Tanzania